Gazi Ali Beg Mosque is a mosque located in the old core of the city of Vushtrri, Kosovo, 100m away from the Old Hammam, as part of the Gazi Ali Beg Complex. Built in the 15th century, it is one of the oldest cultural heritage monuments not only in the municipality of Vushtrri but in Kosovo.

History 
Gazi Ali Beg Mosque was built in the middle of 15th century. From the beginning until today, the Mosque has always served as a sacred object for the rites and religious ceremonies of the Islamic community. Until 1999, although with some small interventions, the mosque had preserved some of the original architectural features.

See also 
 List of monuments in Vushtrri

References 

Mosques in Kosovo
Cultural heritage monuments in Vushtrri